Karen Simpson Nikakis is an Australian fantasy author, writer and poet who lives at Melton, whose first fantasy novel The Whisper of Leaves (2007), has been described as an "impressive debut", with the National Library of Australia describing her first book as heralding "the arrival of an exciting new talent on the Australian fantasy landscape".

Early life 
Nikakis was raised in the central Victorian town of Mansfield, surrounded by the mountains of the Victorian Alps. Her interest in fantasy occurred at age 19, when she read Tolkien's fantasy epic Lord of the Rings. She has since written a number of published academic essays on myth and fantasy writing.

She has worked as a secondary teacher, TAFE teacher and lecturer in business communications at Deakin University. She completed a Master in Education in young adult literature with her thesis being on The Purpose of Dragons in Selected Children’s Literature in the Twentieth Century and went on to complete a PhD in 1997 in fantasy fiction from Victoria University with her thesis on The Use of Narrative in Order to Break the Masculine Domination of the Hero Quest.

Writing
During the 1980s she started writing picture story books, which she also illustrated.

Her first fantasy novel was published by Allen & Unwin in 2007 as The Whisper of Leaves, the first book in a fantasy series: the Kira Chronicles. A second book The Song of the Silvercades was released in July 2008.

In 2008 she was appointed the foundation head of the bachelor's degree in Writing and Publishing for Northern Melbourne Institute of TAFE.

Works

Novels 
 The Whisper of Leaves: Book 1 of the Kira Chronicles (2007) Allen and Unwin
 The Song of the Silvercades: Book 2 of the Kira Chronicles (2008) Allen and Unwin
 The Cry of the Marwing:  Book 3 of the Kira Chronicles (July 2009) Allen and Unwin

Short stories
 The gift in Aurealis #40, Chimaera Publications, Australia, 2008
 Redemption in Moondance – E-zine: USA
 Lovers in Smokelong Quarterly – E-zine: USA
 Song of the frog prince in Zahir #4: USA

References

External links

 Interview: Smoking With Karen Simpson Nikakis, Smokelong Quarterly, Issue 5, August 2004.

Writers from Victoria (Australia)
21st-century Australian novelists
Australian fantasy writers
Australian women short story writers
Living people
Year of birth missing (living people)
Victoria University, Melbourne alumni
Academic staff of Deakin University
Women science fiction and fantasy writers
Australian women novelists
21st-century Australian women writers
21st-century Australian short story writers